The CONMEBOL Copa América de Futsal is the main national futsal competition of the CONMEBOL nations organized by the FIFA. It was first held in 1964 and was organized by Asociación Mundial de Futsal (AMF) as "Sudamericano". The tournament was also a qualifier for the AMF Futsal World Cup. The AMF organised the championship until 1989.

In 1992 Conmebol organized its first South American in Aracaju under the name "Campeonato Conmebol de Futsal (FIFA)". In that tournament only 4 national teams participated (Brazil, Argentina, Paraguay and Ecuador) and it was used as a World Cup qualifier as well than the tournaments of 1996 and 2000 that were called with the same name.

The other tournaments played between 1995 and 1999 were played in Brazil and were called Taça América de Futsal FIFA. The dominance was always of the local team although those tournaments were only competitive without prior classification to any contest.

As of the 2003 edition, it began to be called the "Copa América de Futsal", and the venue of the tournament began to rotate, just as it is done with the traditional Copa América. The first two editions were World Cup qualifying. However, Conmebol created the South American Futsal Qualifiers in 2012, which were repeated in 2016 and 2020. Starting in 2024, the Copa América will be used again to determine qualification for the FIFA Futsal World Cup.

Results

AMF Futsal tournament 
Not considered official by Conmebol/FIFA

Notes

Copa América de Futsal  
Official tournament

Notes

Performance by nations 

* = hosts

Medals

Participating nations
Legend
1st – Champions
2nd – Runners-up
3rd – Third place
4th – Fourth place
5th-6th – Fifth to Sixth place
7th-10th – Seventh to Tenth place
GS – Group stage
 ×  – Did not enter
     – Hosts

Summary (1992 - 2017)

 http://www.futsalplanet.com/
 https://www.rsssf.org/tablesf/futsal-sam.html
 http://old.futsalplanet.com/agenda/agenda-01.asp?id=19137
 http://old.futsalplanet.com/old/turniri/turniri.htm
 http://old.futsalplanet.com/old/Statistics/statistics.htm
 http://old.futsalplanet.com/old/Statistics/data/CONMEBOL.txt
 http://old.futsalplanet.com/agenda/agenda-01.asp?id=20882

FIFA Futsal World Cup Qualifiers
Legend
1st – Champions
2nd – Runners-up
3rd – Third place
4th – Fourth place
QF – Quarterfinals
R2 – Round 2 (1989–2008, second group stage, top 8; 2012–present: knockout round of 16)
R1 – Round 1
     – Hosts
Q – Qualified for upcoming tournament

See also
FIFA Futsal World Cup qualification (CONMEBOL)

References

External links

 1992: https://www.rsssf.org/tablesf/futsal-sam.html#92
 1996: https://www.rsssf.org/tablesf/futsal-sam.html#96
 2000: https://www.rsssf.org/tablesf/futsal-sam.html#00
 1995: https://www.rsssf.org/tablesf/futsal-sam.html#95
 1997: https://www.rsssf.org/tablesf/futsal-sam.html#97
 1998: https://www.rsssf.org/tablesf/futsal-sam.html#98
 1999: https://www.rsssf.org/tablesf/futsal-sam.html#99
 1965-2010: https://www.rsssf.org/tablesf/futsal-sam.html
 1992,1996,2000: http://old.futsalplanet.com/old/Statistics/data/CONMEBOL.txt

 
International futsal competitions
CONMEBOL competitions
Futsal competitions in South America